James Beryl Maas (born 1938) is an American social psychologist and retired professor.  He is best known for his work in the field of sleep research, specifically the relationship between sleep and performance.  He is best known for coining the term "power nap".  He holds a B.A. from Williams College and an M.A. and Ph.D. from Cornell University.  Maas has also produced numerous film specials on sleep research for PBS, BBC, and others.

For 48 years Maas taught psychology as a professor at Cornell University.  In January 1995 a Cornell University ethics committee recommended sanctions against Maas for sexual harassment. On June 23, 1995 the Cornell University Administration published a press release that found Maas had neither sought "an intimate sexual relationship with any of his students nor...engaged in the physically abusive behaviors often associated with the term 'sexual harassment.'" 

Maas continued as a distinguished professor until his retirement on December 31, 2011. He currently serves on the advisory board of American Sleep Association.

References

External links
Maas's faculty page at Cornell (now in archive.org)
Dr. Maas's Website

1938 births
Living people
American social psychologists
Cornell University alumni
Cornell University faculty
Williams College alumni
Scientists from Detroit